Revelstoke-Slocan was the name of a provincial electoral district in the Canadian province of British Columbia from 1966 to 1986.  The riding was formed from a merger of the Revelstoke riding with the Slocan riding.  The successor riding in this region is the current Columbia River-Revelstoke riding.

For other historical and current ridings in the region see Kootenay (electoral districts) and Okanagan (electoral districts).

Notable MLAs 
William Stewart King served as Minister of Labour in the 1972 NDP government.

Electoral history 
Note:  Winners in each election are in bold.

|Independent
|David Roy Collier
|align="right"|105  
|align="right"|2.17%
|align="right"|
|align="right"|unknown

 
|Liberal
|George Wilfred Laforme
|align="right"|548 
|align="right"|11.34%
|align="right"|
|align="right"|unknown
|- bgcolor="white"
!align="right" colspan=3|Total valid votes
!align="right"|4,831 
!align="right"|100.00%
!align="right"|
|- bgcolor="white"
!align="right" colspan=3|Total rejected ballots
!align="right"|32
!align="right"|
!align="right"|
|- bgcolor="white"
!align="right" colspan=3|Turnout
!align="right"|%
!align="right"|
!align="right"|
|}

 
|New Democrat
|William Stewart King
|align="right"|2,611
|align="right"|42.59%
|align="right"|
|align="right"|unknown
 
|Liberal
|Douglas Charles Stewart
|align="right"|416
|align="right"|6.79%
|align="right"|
|align="right"|unknown
|- bgcolor="white"
!align="right" colspan=3|Total valid votes
!align="right"|6,130
!align="right"|100.00%
!align="right"|
|- bgcolor="white"
!align="right" colspan=3|Total rejected ballots
!align="right"|44
!align="right"|
!align="right"|
|- bgcolor="white"
!align="right" colspan=3|Turnout
!align="right"|%
!align="right"|
!align="right"|
|}

 
|Progressive Conservative
|Margaret Rose Illman
|align="right"|158 
|align="right"|2.30%
|align="right"|
|align="right"|unknown
 
|New Democrat
|William Stewart King
|align="right"|3,748
|align="right"|54.56%
|align="right"|
|align="right"|unknown
 
|Liberal
|Bernard Charles Lavallee
|align="right"|384
|align="right"|5.59%
|align="right"|
|align="right"|unknown
|- bgcolor="white"
!align="right" colspan=3|Total valid votes
!align="right"|6,870 
!align="right"|100.00%
!align="right"|
|- bgcolor="white"
!align="right" colspan=3|Total rejected ballots
!align="right"|60
!align="right"|
!align="right"|
|- bgcolor="white"
!align="right" colspan=3|Turnout
!align="right"|%
!align="right"|
!align="right"|
|}

 
|Liberal
|Ronald Harvey Holoday
|align="right"|428  
|align="right"|5.76%
|align="right"|
|align="right"|unknown
 
|New Democrat
|William Stewart King
|align="right"|3,988
|align="right"|53.68%
|align="right"|
|align="right"|unknown

|- bgcolor="white"
!align="right" colspan=3|Total valid votes
!align="right"|7,429
!align="right"|100.00%
!align="right"|
|- bgcolor="white"
!align="right" colspan=3|Total rejected ballots
!align="right"|99
!align="right"|
!align="right"|
|- bgcolor="white"
!align="right" colspan=3|Turnout
!align="right"|%
!align="right"|
!align="right"|
|}

The riding was redistributed after the 1975 election.  In 1979 the area was in the Shuswap-Revelstoke riding while the Slocan area became represented by Nelson-Creston.

Sources 

Elections BC Historical Returns

Former provincial electoral districts of British Columbia